This is a list of butterflies of Kazakhstan. Over 370 species are known from Kazakhstan.

Family Papilionidae 

 Papilio machaon
 Parnassius apollo
 Iphiclides podalirius

Family Nymphalidae 

 Chazara enervata
 Vanessa cardui
 Aglais urticae
 Nymphalis xanthomelas
 Melitaea didyma
 Argynnis pandora
 Aglais io
 Melanargia parce
 Chazara briseis
 Melanargia russiae
 Niobe fritillary
 Argynnis paphia
 Neptis rivularis
 Issoria lathonia
 Hyponephele lupina
 Kirinia eversmanni
 Boloria sipora
 Coenonympha pamphilus
 Hyponephele dysdora
 Vanessa atalanta
 Chazara kaufmanni
 Melitaea phoebe

Family Pieridae 

 Pontia edusa
 Aporia crataegi
 Pieris brassicae
 Gonepteryx rhamni
 Pieris rapae
 Colias erate

Family Lycaenidae 

 Polyommatus icarus
 Lycaena thersamon
 Glaucopsyche alexis

References 

Lists of butterflies by location
Butterflies of Asia
Butterflies by location

Butterflies